The Minister for Children and Young People is a junior ministerial post in the Scottish Government.  As a result, the Minister does not attend the Scottish Cabinet.  The post was created in May 2007 after the appointment of the Scottish National Party minority administration and the minister reports to the Cabinet Secretary for Education and Skills, who has overall responsibility for the portfolio, and is a member of Cabinet.  The Minister for Children and Young people has specific responsibility for the social services workforce, childcare and preschool, children's services, children's hearings and the Care Inspectorate.

Overview 
The post holder is responsible for:

 adoption and fostering
 childcare implementation
 children's hearings
 child protection
 children's rights
 children's services
 early years
 looked after children
 protection of vulnerable groups
 social service workforce

History
From 1999 to 2000, responsibility for Children and Early Years rested with the Minister for Children and Education, which became the Minister for Education, Europe and External Affairs in the McLeish Government of 2000 to 2001. From 2001 to 2007 the  portfolio rested with the Minister for Education and Young People. The Salmond government, elected following the 2007 Scottish Parliament election created the junior post of the Minister for Children and Early Years to assist the Cabinet Secretary for Education and Skills. The post was renamed Minister for Children and Young People in June 2018.

Minister
The current Minister for Children and Young People is Maree Todd.

See also
Scottish Parliament
Scottish Government

References

External links
Cabinet and Ministers on Scottish Government website
Minister for Children and Young People on Scottish Government website

Children and Young People
Youth in Scotland